William Haughton may refer to:

 William Haughton (playwright) (died 1605), English playwright
 Billy Haughton (1923–1986), American harness driver and trainer
 Bill Haughton (1923–2003), Irish field hockey player and cricketer

See also
 William Houghton (disambiguation)
 Billy Houghton (born 1939), English footballer